Pickpocket is a 1959 French film written and directed by Robert Bresson, the first for which Bresson wrote an original screenplay rather than adapting an existing work. It stars Martin LaSalle, who was a nonprofessional actor at the time, in the title role, and features Marika Green, Pierre Leymarie, and Jean Pélégri in supporting roles. The film is generally considered to be one of Bresson's greatest films.

Plot
Michel goes to a race at Longchamp Racecourse and takes some money from a woman's purse. He leaves the track confident he was not noticed, but is suddenly arrested. At the police station, the chief inspector releases him because it cannot be proven that he stole the money.

The next day, Michel goes to visit his sickly mother, who he has not seen in a month. Her neighbor, Jeanne, offers to let him in the apartment, but, instead, he gives her money to give his mother and leaves. Michel goes to meet his friend Jacques at a bar and asks for help finding a job. He sees the chief inspector and they wind up discussing Michel's theory that certain superior men should not be bound by the same laws as everyone else.

In the subway, Michel notices a pickpocket. He practices the technique he observed and employs it successfully. Later, he tells Jacques that he is no longer looking for a job.

After spending a week in the subway picking pockets, Michel is caught, so he lays low for a few days. He notices a mysterious man lurking outside, but is interrupted when Jacques shows up with Jeanne, who tells Michel that his mother is ill. Michel sends Jacques to see his mother in his place and goes out to find the mysterious man. The man turns out to be a pickpocket, and he teaches Michel several new techniques.

When she is on her deathbed, Michel finally goes to see his mother. She says she is not worried about him and he says he is sure she will get better, but she dies soon after. Michel and the mysterious man begin to work together, and they eventually bring in a third man.

On a Sunday, Michel goes to a carnival with Jacques and Jeanne. While they are on a ride, he wanders off. Jacques finds him at his apartment cleaning himself up, having fallen during his escape from a man whose watch he stole. Michel asks if Jacques and Jeanne love each other, and Jacques leaves.

Michel and his two accomplices undertake coordinated pickpocketing sprees at crowded locations, and one day he gets to Gare de Lyon station and sees his accomplices being led away in handcuffs. He goes home, and the chief inspector comes by to tell him that, a month before he was arrested at the racetrack, Jeanne reported some money had been stolen from Michel's mother, but the complaint was withdrawn the next day. Deeming it unlikely Michel will turn his life around, the inspector indicates he is going to start watching Michel more closely.

Jeanne tells Michel that the police recently asked her to confirm his mother is the one who withdrew her complaint, which shows Michel that his mother knew he robbed her. Jeanne has still not figured this out, but he catches her up. Although she is appalled, she tearfully hugs him before he leaves and asks if he is going to run away before the inspector catches him, giving him the idea to do just that.

Michel spends two years in London "pulling off good jobs", but he blows all of his money gambling and on women and returns to Paris. He goes to see Jeanne and discovers she and Jacques had a child, who she is raising alone because she did not want to marry him. Michel offers to help her support the child by getting an honest job, and he follows through. He is feeling good, but is drawn to a man reading the racing form and finds himself accompanying the man to Longchamp. Although suspicious when the man seems to win a bet he should have lost, Michel still tries to steal the money and is arrested, as the man is a plainclothes officer.

At first, Michel is mostly just upset he was caught. He cannot understand why Jeanne visits him in jail, but, after she does not come for three weeks, he finds his hands shaking as he reads a letter explaining that her child has been sick. When he sees her again, she seems lit up, and he realizes he loves her.

Cast
 Martin LaSalle as Michel
 Marika Green as Jeanne
 Jean Pélégri as the Chief Inspector
 Dolly Scal as the Mother
 Pierre Leymarie as Jacques
 Henri Kassagi as 1st Accomplice
 Pierre Étaix as 2nd Accomplice
 César Gattegno as an Inspector

Production
Bresson said Pickpocket "was written in three months and shot in the midst of crowds in a minimal amount of time." The resulting disorder proved to be a challenge during shooting, but was sometimes used to the crew's advantage, as in the Gare de Lyon pickpocketing sequence.

At one point in the film, Jacques reads and asks to borrow Michel's copy of Richard S. Lambert's The Prince of Pickpockets: A Study of George Barrington.

Style
The film has been called an example of "parametric narration", in which the style "dominates the syuzhet [plot] or is seemingly equal in importance to it".

Critical reception
Roger Ebert saw echoes of Dostoyevsky's Crime and Punishment in Pickpocket, writing: "Bresson's Michel, like Dostoyevsky's hero Raskolnikov, needs money in order to realize his dreams, and sees no reason why some lackluster ordinary person should not be forced to supply it. The reasoning is immoral, but the characters claim special privileges above and beyond common morality. Michel, like the hero of Crime and Punishment, has a 'good woman' in his life, who trusts he will be able to redeem himself. ... She comes to Michel with the news that his mother is dying. Michel does not want to see his mother, but gives Jeanne money for her. Why does he avoid her? Bresson never supplies motives. We can only guess." Additionally, in the film Michel gets caught up in a game of cat and mouse with a police inspector, much as Raskolnikov does in Dostoyevsky's novel.

Awards
Pickpocket was nominated for the Golden Bear at the 10th Berlin International Film Festival.

Influence and legacy
The film exerted a formative influence over the work of Paul Schrader, who has described it as "an unmitigated masterpiece" and "as close to perfect as there can be", and whose films American Gigolo (1980), Patty Hearst (1988), Light Sleeper (1992), First Reformed (2017), and The Card Counter (2021) all feature endings similar to that of Pickpocket. In addition, Schrader's screenplay for Martin Scorsese's Taxi Driver (1976) bears many similarities, including confessional narration and a voyeuristic look at society. Schrader's admiration for Pickpocket led to his providing a filmed introduction for The Criterion Collection's 2005 DVD release of the film. Schrader listed Pickpocket as one of his top ten favorite films in both the 2012 and 2022 Sight and Sound polls of the greatest films of all time.

Greek filmmaker Theo Angelopoulos listed the film among his top ten favorite films of all time for the 2002 Sight and Sound poll. German-American actress and screenwriter Christa Lang listed the film among her top ten favorite films that are part of The Criterion Collection, as did American filmmaker Richard Linklater. In 2016, German filmmaker Werner Herzog praised the film by calling it "phenomenal" and "So intense and so beautiful… It makes you ache".

Pickpocket has been paraphrased by other films, such as Leos Carax's Les Amants du Pont-Neuf (1991). The Dardenne brothers's 2005 film L'Enfant has also been said to have been influenced by the film. Christopher Nolan said he studied Pickpocket, along with Bresson's earlier film A Man Escaped, when making his 2017 film Dunkirk, to study how Bresson created suspense through details.

References

External links
 
 Pickpocket: Robert Bresson: Hidden in Plain Sight an essay by Gary Indiana at the Criterion Collection

1959 crime drama films
Existentialist films
French black-and-white films
Films about atonement
Films directed by Robert Bresson
Films set in Paris
Films shot in Paris
French crime drama films
Films about theft
1950s French films